MOPP or Mopp may refer to:

People 
 Max Oppenheimer (1885-1954), Austrian painter known as "Mopp"

Acronyms  
 MOPP (chemotherapy), a combination chemotherapy regimen used to treat Hodgkin's disease
 MOPP (electrical safety), a concept introduced in the standard for medical electrical equipment
 MOPP (protective gear), protective gear used by U.S. military personnel in a toxic environment
Moral Philosophy and Politics, an academic philosophical journal abbreviated as "MOPP".

See also
 MOP (disambiguation)
 Mrs Mopp, a 1983 video game
 Mrs Mopp, a fictional character in the BBC radio show It's That Man Again